Decide may refer to:

Decide!, an Italian political association
Decide, Kentucky
, a decision support model in various domains

See also
Decider (disambiguation)